Kudu is the name of two species of antelope.

Kudu may also refer to:
 Kudu, the word for turtle in several languages of southern Cameroon
 Kudu, Tamil equivalent of gavaksha, a round "window" motif in Hindu temple architectural ornament
 KUDU, a radio station
 Kudu Records, a sister label of CTI Records
 Kudu (restaurant), a chain of fast food restaurants based in Saudi Arabia
 Kudu, Russia, a selo (village) in Verkhnevilyuysky District, Sakha Republic
 Apache Kudu, a column-oriented data store of the Apache Hadoop ecosystem
 Atlas Kudu, an airplane

See also
 Kudus (disambiguation)